Gerlando "Lando" Buzzanca (24 August 1935 – 18 December 2022) was an Italian stage, film, and television actor whose career spanned 65 years.

Life and career

Early years
Born in Palermo the son of a cinema projectionist, at 16 years old Buzzanca left the high school and moved to Rome to pursue his dream of becoming an actor. In order to survive, he took many jobs including waiter, furniture mover, and a brief appearance as a slave in the film Ben-Hur. He made his official debut in Pietro Germi's Divorce Italian Style, and soon specialized in the role of the average immigrant from southern Italy.

1970s–1980s: Huge success in the commedia sexy all'italiana

After two successful "James Tont" films in which he played a parody of James Bond, starting from the late 1960s, Buzzanca got a large success in a series of satirical commedia sexy all'italiana films which satirized major institutions such as politics, religion, trade unions and financial world. Lando Buzzanca with Laura Antonelli in Il merlo maschio (1971) directed by Pasquale Festa Campanile, which was a huge success and made him a major star in the genre of commedia sexy all'italiana.
In the following years he thus finds himself acting alongside famous actresses of the moment, such as Claudia Cardinale, Catherine Spaak, Barbara Bouchet, Gloria Guida, Senta Berger and Joan Collins.

1990s–2000s: The theater, the last great film and the well received TV series.
With the decline of the genre, he slowed his film activities, focusing into theatre and television, in which he  enjoyed a resurgence of popularity in the 2000s thanks to a series of well-received TV-series.

In 2007 he starred in the feature film I Viceré by Roberto Faenza, for which he was nominated for the David di Donatello for best leading actor and won the Globo d'oro for best actor.

2010s: Success of the TV series
From 2012 to 2014 Buzzanca played the lead actor in the successful TV series il restauratore, in 28 episodes.
Buzzanca concluded the series despite the depression caused by the death of his wife, the suicide attempt and the onset of an mild cerebral ischemia.

Later years 
In 2013, following the death of his wife Lucia and a heavy depression, Buzzanca attempted suicide by cutting his veins.
In 2014 he suffered from a mild cerebral ischemia which caused him aphasia, but by the following year he had fully recovered from his depressive period and started a relationship with a younger woman, Antonella.
In 2016 he participated as dancer in the television program Ballando con le Stelle and started a romance with a younger actress and journalist Francesca Della Valle.

2020s: physical decline
On 21 April 2021, he fell at home and suffered a head injury; he was rescued by the maid, who found him the day after the accident still unconscious on the ground and called an ambulance. He was admitted to the Santo Spirito hospital in Rome.
On 15 August 2021, Buzzanca, after the treatment received at the hospital, seemed to have fully recovered, as confirmed also by his son Massimiliano.
On 27 December 2021, Buzzanca was hospitalized at the health facility in Rome, due to the worsening of his health conditions.
In his later years Buzzanca suffered from senile dementia.

Death
On 18 December 2022, Buzzanca died at the Agostino Gemelli University Policlinic in Rome, where he was recovered a few days prior because of a fall, at the age of 87.

On 21 December 2022, the funeral ceremony took place in the Church of the Artists in Rome, in which his partner Francesca Della Valle unexpectedly did not take part.

Awards
	
David di Donatello
	

	
|-
	
| 2008
	
| I Vicerè
	
| Best Actor
	
| 
|}
	
	
Globo d'oro, Italy
	

	
|-
	
| 2008
	
| I Vicerè
	
| Best Actor
	
| 
	
|}

Filmography

Television

References

External links 

 

1935 births
2022 deaths 
Accidental deaths from falls 
Accidental deaths in Italy
Male actors from Palermo
Italian male film actors
Italian male television actors
20th-century Italian male actors
21st-century Italian male actors